The "Looking Glass" Children's Musical Theatre is a theatre in Saint Petersburg on 13 Rubinstein Street.

History of the name
The theatre appeared in August 1987 and was named after the Lewis Carroll's "Through the Looking-Glass, and What Alice Found There". Dir. A.V. Petrov and conductor P.A. Bubelnikov organized the theater which was opened on 27 December 1987 with the opera of L.A. Desyatnikov "Bravo-Bravissimo, pioneer Anisimov or no one wants to sing".

Notable productions
Most of the titles are addressed to the repertoire of both audiences: adults and children.

Awards
The performances "Love potion", "Kashtanka", "La Boheme" are marked with "Gold mask" and "Gold soffit" prizes.

Historical background
In the 1870s Petersburg Actor's Club was situated in the building on Troitskaya Street., 13.

Children's theatre
Children's experimental theatre "Zazerkalie" appeared in 1992.  In the experimental theatre you can study actor's skills, choreography and scenic speech as well as participate in theatre performances.

See also
Through the Looking-Glass, and What Alice Found There,
Lewis Carroll

References

External links
 Official Website of the theatre.

Theatres in Saint Petersburg
Opera houses in Russia
Cultural heritage monuments of regional significance in Saint Petersburg